The C.J.H. Bassett House is a historic house located at 20 Chestnut Street in Taunton, Massachusetts. The house was built in 1851 for Charles Jarvis Hunt Bassett, a prominent Taunton attorney and president of the Taunton Bank.

Description and history 
The house is locally significant as a rare example of a Gothic Revival residence in the city. The -story frame house features an irregular floor plan and a belcast gable roof with Gothic Revival influenced vergeboards, incised and punched with quatrefoil motifs, and pointed arch dormer windows.

It was added to the National Register of Historic Places on July 5, 1984.

See also
National Register of Historic Places listings in Taunton, Massachusetts

References

National Register of Historic Places in Taunton, Massachusetts
Houses in Taunton, Massachusetts
Houses on the National Register of Historic Places in Bristol County, Massachusetts
Gothic Revival architecture in Massachusetts
Houses completed in 1851